Hairgate may refer to:

 Bill Clinton haircut allegations in 1993 after he had his hair cut aboard a plane
 iPhone 6#Hair ripping, when a fanpage claimed that users' hair could get caught and ripped out by the phone
 2006 ball-tampering controversy, involving umpire Darrel Hair

See also
List of scandals with "-gate" suffix